G. Karthikeyan (20 January 1949 – 7 March 2015) was an Indian politician and former speaker of the Kerala Legislative Assembly. He was the Member of the Legislative Assembly from Aruvikkara constituency, who represented the Indian National Congress.

Political life
G. Karthikeyan entered politics through student movements and was a leader of Kerala Students Union (KSU). He held a Bachelor of Laws degree. He served as the State president of Kerala Students Union. He was a Student member of senate of Kerala University and Secretary of Kerala University Union. He also held various posts in Youth Congress, including State General Secretary and State President. He was the General Secretary of Kerala Pradesh Congress Committee (KPCC). Karthikeyan was the only elected Vice President of KPCC and also served as the Chief Whip and Deputy Leader of the Congress Legislature Party. He served as Minister for Electricity (Government of Kerala) in the Ministry headed by  Shri A.K. Antony in 1995 and was the Minister for Food and Civil Supplies in the A.K. Antony Ministry in 2001. He was also an A.I.C.C. Member.

G Karthikeyan has been elected to the Kerala Legislative Assembly as M.L.A in 1982 (Trivandrum North),1991, 1996, 2001 and 2006 (Aryanad) and in 2011 (Aruvikkara). He was elected as the speaker of Kerala Legislative Assembly in 2011, succeeding K. Radhakrishnan. He died on 7 March 2015, aged 66, at Health Care Global (H.C.G.) hospital in Bangalore, after suffering from serious complications of cancer. He was the second Speaker to die in office, after K. M. Seethi Sahib in 1961, and the first to die during a legislative session. He is survived by his wife and children.

References

1949 births
2015 deaths
Malayali politicians
Indian National Congress politicians from Kerala
Politicians from Thiruvananthapuram
Speakers of the Kerala Legislative Assembly
Deaths from cancer in India
Kerala MLAs 1982–1987
Kerala MLAs 1996–2001
Kerala MLAs 2006–2011